Osteoclast-stimulating factor 1 is a protein that in humans is encoded by the OSTF1 gene.

References

Further reading